Alex Crognale (born August 27, 1994) is an American professional soccer player who plays as a defender for USL Championship club Birmingham Legion.

Career

Youth and college
Born in Columbus, Ohio, Crognale is a product of the youth academy of Columbus Crew SC, before playing four years of college soccer at the University of Maryland between 2013 and 2016. In 2016, Crognale captained the Terrapins to a third straight Big Ten tourney title, and was named Big Ten Defensive Player of the Year. He was also chosen for the First-Team All-American in 2016

Columbus Crew SC
On December 13, 2016 it was announced that Crognale had signed a homegrown contract with Columbus Crew SC of Major League Soccer.

He made his professional debut on March 18, 2017, against D.C. United.

Orange County SC
On March 15, 2018, Crognale joined Orange County SC on loan from Columbus Crew SC on a game-by-game basis. He made his debut on March 17, 2018 in a 1–1 draw against Phoenix Rising FC, coming on as a substitute and scoring the equalizing goal in the 90th minute.

Indy Eleven
On March 15, 2019, Crognale joined Indy Eleven on loan from Columbus Crew SC.

Birmingham Legion
On December 23, 2019, Crognale signed a multi-year contract with Birmingham Legion FC. On October 21, 2020, Crognale was named Legion FC Defensive Player of the Year for the 2020 season. Crognale led the team in minutes, clearances and blocks, and started every match of the season for Birmingham in 2020.

Personal life
Crognale was born in the United States, and is of Italian descent.

Alex is the brother of fellow professional soccer player Eli Crognale, who also played for Birmingham Legion.

Career statistics

References

External links
 
 

1994 births
Living people
American soccer players
American people of Italian descent
Maryland Terrapins men's soccer players
Columbus Crew players
Orange County SC players
Indy Eleven players
Birmingham Legion FC players
Association football defenders
Soccer players from Columbus, Ohio
Major League Soccer players
USL Championship players
Lincoln High School (Gahanna, Ohio) alumni
All-American men's college soccer players
Homegrown Players (MLS)